Monitorul Oficial al României is the official gazette of Romania, in which all the promulgated bills, presidential decrees, governmental ordinances and other major legal acts are published.

External links

 
 The Official Gazette of Romania – Tradition and Present Status
 Legislatia Romaniei si U.E.
 Official Gazette listing 2005 - 2007
 Collection of editions from 1875 to 1949

Government of Romania
Newspapers published in Romania
Government gazettes
Publications established in 1832